Graphic Universe, an imprint of Lerner Publishing Group, was launched in 2006 and publishes books in graphic novel format.

History 
In 2006, Lerner Publishing Group created the Graphic Universe imprint for the purpose of publishing graphic novels for young and developing readers. Initial series included Graphic Myths and Legends (sequential retellings of famous myths from around the world) and Twisted Journeys (an interactive fiction series similar in nature to Choose Your Own Adventure, done in a mix of prose and comics storytelling). The imprint later began to publish a variety of foreign children's comics in translations and many award-winning creator-owned graphic novels.

Graphic Myths and Legends
Graphic Myths and Legends is the first series published by Graphic Universe. There are currently a total of 27 titles in the series. The books are full-color comic retellings of famous myths from around the world, including Hercules and Amaterasu. The series has the trade byline of "Supreme artwork and storytelling." Graphic Myths and Legends is drawn and inked by some of the top artists in the industry.

Titles

Ali Baba : Fooling the Forty Thieves
Amaterasu : Return of the Sun
Arthur & Lancelot : The Fight for Camelot
Atalanta : The Race against Destiny
Beowulf : Monster Slayer
Demeter & Persephone : Spring Held Hostage
Guan Yu : Blood Brothers to the End
Hercules : The Twelve Labors
The Hero Twins : Against the Lords of Death
Isis & Osiris : To the Ends of the Earth
Jason : Quest for the Golden Fleece
King Arthur : Excalibur Unsheathed
Marwe : Into the Land of the Dead
Odysseus : Escaping Poseidon's Curse
Perseus : The Hunt for Medusa's Head
Pigling : A Cinderella Story
Psyche & Eros : The Lady and the Monster
Robin Hood : Outlaw of Sherwood Forest
Sinbad : Sailing into Peril
The Smoking Mountain : The Story of Popocatépetl and Iztaccíhuatl
Sunjata : Warrior King of Mali
Theseus : Battling the Minotaur
Thor & Loki : In the Land of Giants
Tristan & Isolde : The Warrior and the Princess
The Trojan Horse : The Fall of Troy
William Tell : One against an Empire
Yu the Great : Conquering the Flood

Twisted Journeys
Twisted Journeys is an interactive fiction series similar in nature to Choose Your Own Adventure, done in a mix of written and comic format. Some pages are done in a comic layout, and others are done in novel format. Traditional drawing, inking, coloring, and lettering techniques are used throughout.

Titles
1 - Captured by Pirates
2 - Escape from Pyramid X
3 - Terror in Ghost Mansion
4 - The Treasure of Mount Fate
5 - Nightmare on Zombie Island 
6 - The Time Travel Trap
7 - Vampire Hunt
8 - Alien Incident on Planet J
9 - Agent Mongoose and the Hypno-Beam Scheme
10 - The Goblin King
11 - Shipwrecked on Mad Island
12 - Kung Fu Masters
13 - School of Evil
14 - Attack of the Mutant Meteors
15 - Agent Mongoose and the Attack of the Giant Insects
16 - The Quest for Dragon Mountain
17 - Detective Frankenstein
18 - Horror In Space
19 - The Fifth Musketeer
20 - Peril in Summerland Park
21 - Safari Survivor
22 - Hero City

Foreign imports
Graphic Universe also publishes foreign titles in translation, usually from French.

Titles
The ElseWhere Chronicles (originally Les Enfants d'ailleurs)
Waluk
William and the Lost Spirit
First Man: Reimagining Matthew Henson
Terrorist: Gavrilo Princip, the Assassin Who Ignited World War I
Marco Polo: The Silk Road
Hotel Strange
Lou!
Mortensen's Escapades
Mr. Badger and Mrs. Fox
A Game for Swallows
A Bag of Marbles
I Remember Beirut
The Other Side of the Wall
Tao, the Little Samurai
The Little Prince
Tib & Tumtum
Where's Leopold?

Selected Honors for Graphic Universe Books

Will Eisner Comic Industry Awards nominees

A Bag of Marbles by Joseph Joffo, Kris, and Vincent Bailly [Best Reality-Based Work]
BirdCatDog by Lee Nordling & Meritxell Bosch [Best Publication for Early Readers]
The Ferret's a Foot by Colleen AF Venable and Stephanie Yue [Best Publication for Kids]

Junior Library Guild selections

A Bag of Marbles by Joseph Joffo, Kris, and Vincent Bailly
Believe Your Eyes by Cori Doerrfeld and Tyler Page
The Ferret's a Foot by Colleen AF Venable, and Stephanie Yue
A Game for Swallows: To Die, To Leave, To Return by Zeina Abirached
Hercules: The Twelve Labors by Paul D. Storrie and Steve Kurth
I Remember Beirut by Zeina Abirached
Little White Duck: A Childhood in China by Andrés Vera Martínez, Na Liu, and Andrés Vera Martínez
The Maltese Mummy by Trina Robbins and Tyler Page
Terrorist: Gavrilo Princip, the Assassin Who Ignited World War I by Henrik Rehr
Truth in Sight by Cori Doerrfeld and Tyler Page

Kirkus Best Children’s Books

And Then There Were Gnomes by Colleen AF Venable and Stephanie Yue
BirdCatDog by Lee Nordling & Meritxell Bosch
Hamster and Cheese by Colleen AF Venable and Stephanie Yue
Little White Duck: A Childhood in China by Andrés Vera Martínez, Na Liu, and Andrés Vera Martínez
Wrapped Up in You by Dan Jolley and Natalie Nourigat [Best Teen Books of the Year]

Artists and Authors 
Many well-known artists and other members of the comic industry have worked with the various Graphic Universe titles, including Dan Jolley, Thomas Yeates, John McCrea, Trina Robbins, Alitha Martinez, Meritxell Bosch, Na Liu, Zeina Abirached, Bannister, Craig Hamilton, Andrés Vera Martínez, Ron Fontes, Lee Nordling, Steve Kurth, Tyler Page, Cori Doerrfeld, Henrik Rehr, Paul Storrie, Simon Schwartz, Jeff Limke, Stephanie Yue, Colleen AF Venable, and Ron Randall.

Comic book publishing companies of the United States
Privately held companies based in New York City